Michael Mazzariello (also known as Judge Mazz) is an attorney and television personality known for his syndicated courtroom show Street Court where he makes rulings at the scene of the dispute. He also has been featured as a legal expert on CNN, Court TV, and MSNBC. Before starting his show in 2009, Mazzariello had previously served as an assistant district attorney in Brooklyn and high-profile plaintiffs’ and criminal defense lawyer. Mayor Rudolph Giuliani appointed him as the Chief Prosecutor for the New York City Board of Education and he has also served as an adjunct instructor at Marist College. He has never been a judge, although he did unsuccessfully run for town justice of Newburgh, New York in 2003.

References 

Judge Mazz's Bio- WPIX

1950s births
20th-century American lawyers
21st-century American lawyers
Arbitrators
Lawyers from Brooklyn
Living people
Male television personalities
Marist College faculty
New York City Department of Education
People from Newburgh, New York
Television judges
Television personalities from New York City